Kooveri  is a village in Chapparapadavu Grama Panchayat of Kannur district in the Indian state of Kerala.

Demographics
 India census, Kooveri had a population of 19,033 with 9,111 (47.9%) males and 9,922 (52.1%) females. Kooveri village have an area of 38.32 km2 with 4,201 families residing in it. Average sex ratio was 1089 higher than the state average of 1084. In Kooveri, 11.3% of the population was under 6 years of age. Kooveri had an average literacy of 91.7% lower than the state average of 94%; male literacy was 95.9% and female literacy was 87.9%.

Administration
Kooveri village is a part of Chapparapadavu Grama Panchayat in Taliparamba Block Panchayat. Kooveri is politically part of Taliparamba (State Assembly constituency) under Kannur Loksabha.

References

Villages near Taliparamba